An annular solar eclipse occurred on Thursday, June 10, 2021, when the Moon passed between Earth and the Sun, thereby partly obscuring the image of the Sun for a viewer on Earth. During the eclipse, the Moon's apparent diameter was smaller than the Sun's, so it caused the Sun to look like an annulus. The annular eclipse was visible from parts of northeastern Canada, Greenland, the Arctic Ocean (passing over the North Pole), and the Russian Far East, whilst the eclipse appeared partial from a region thousands of kilometres wide, which included northeastern North America, most of Europe, and northern Asia.

Path 

The annular eclipse started at 09:55 UTC for 3 minutes 37 seconds along the northern shore of Lake Superior in Ontario, Canada. The path of the antumbral shadow then headed across Hudson Bay through northwestern Quebec and the Hudson Strait to Baffin Island in Nunavut, where the town of Iqaluit saw 3 minutes and 5 seconds of annularity. After this, it then travelled across Baffin Bay and along the northwestern coast of Greenland, where the point of greatest eclipse occurred at 10:41 UTC in Nares Strait for 3 minutes 51 seconds. The shadow then crossed Ellesmere Island and the Arctic Ocean, passing over the North Pole (which was located away from the central line of the eclipse but saw 2 minutes and 36 seconds of annularity), before heading south towards northeastern Siberia, where the city of Srednekolymsk saw 3 minutes and 35 seconds of annularity at 11:27 UTC. Shortly afterwards, the central line of the annular eclipse ended at 11:29 UTC.

Gallery

Related eclipses

Other eclipses in 2021 
 A total lunar eclipse on May 26.
 A partial lunar eclipse on November 19.
 A total solar eclipse on December 4.

Tzolkinex 
 Preceded: Solar eclipse of April 29, 2014

 Followed: Solar eclipse of July 22, 2028

Half-saros cycle 
 Preceded: Lunar eclipse of June 4, 2012

 Followed: Lunar eclipse of June 15, 2030

Tritos 
 Preceded: Solar eclipse of July 11, 2010

 Followed: Solar eclipse of May 9, 2032

Triad 
 Preceded: Solar eclipse of August 10, 1934

 Followed: Solar eclipse of April 11, 2108

Solar eclipses of 2018–2021

Saros 147

Inex series 

In the 19th century:
 Solar saros 140: total solar eclipse of October 29, 1818
 Solar saros 141: annular solar eclipse of October 9, 1847
 Solar saros 142: total solar eclipse of September 17, 1876

In the 22nd century:
 Solar Saros 150: Partial solar eclipse of April 11, 2108
 Solar Saros 151: Annular solar eclwssipse of March 21, 2137

 Solar Saros 152: Total solar eclipse of March 2, 2166
 Solar Saros 153: Annular solar eclipse of February 10, 2195
0ü000ü

Metonic series

References

External links

 solar-eclipse.de: The annular solar eclipse of 06/10/2021

 Photo of annular eclipse from Chokurdakh, Yakutia, Russia

2021 6 10
2021 in science
2021 06 10
2021 06 10
June 2021 events
2021 in Canada
2021 in Greenland
2021 in Russia